This is Perth is a satirical Australian short film made by Vincenzo Perrella and Dan Osborn. The film became a viral internet hit and the most viewed Western Australian short film shortly after it was released online in August 2009. Profiled across all mainstream media outlets in WA, it was cited as reigniting the so-called Perth ‘Dullsville’ debate, and has been archived in the local studies section of the City of Perth library.

Synopsis
Created and performed entirely by Vincenzo Perrella and Dan Osborn, with music written and performed by Adrian Kingwell, it is made in the style of an expository film. It ostensibly represents Perth as ‘the greatest city in the world’, while an enthusiastic voice over is contradicted with images of an empty city. It also suggests a fantastical element to the city by referring to ‘Old Bertie’, a mythical Kracken that lurks in the Swan River.

References

External links
 This is Perth - This is Perth on YouTube
 PERRELLA & OSBORN - Perrella & Osborn official website

2009 films
Australian comedy short films
2000s English-language films
2000s Australian films